Deadlight is the fourth album released by the Finnish band Before the Dawn. It was released on April 4, 2007. Before the Dawn joined Stay Heavy Records for the release of this album. This was a turning point in the history of the band, although also this time Tuomas was forced to play most of the instruments himself: "We had to fire the drummer after one week ... And then also our second guitarist was too busy with his other band recording, so I played all the guitars. So on the album it is only me and Lars."

Background
Additional musicians on Deadlight are Juho Räihä (guitar solo on "Fear Me") and Katja Vauhkonen (female vocals on "Star of Fire" and "..."). Juho, who produced the Dawn of Solace album The Darkness, also produced this CD.

Shortly after the album release, Dani Miettinen returned to the band.

Deadlight features the band's major hit "Deadsong", which became a staple of every live show until their 2013 split-up. "Deadsong" (released as a single on 14 February 2007)

Track listing

Charts

References

External links
 Before the Dawn official website Media page

2007 albums
Before the Dawn (band) albums